The  Alliance Party is a centrist American political party formed in 2019. It is affiliated with the American Party of South Carolina, Independence Party of Minnesota, Independent Party of Connecticut, and Reform Party of Florida. In 2020, Independence Party of New York affiliated with the Alliance Party, but disaffiliated in 2021.

History

Formation

On May 10, 2016, the Independence Party of Minnesota and the Independent Party of Oregon announced that they would seek to unite fourteen centrist minor political parties and possibly run a presidential candidate. Bernie Sanders won the Independent Party of Oregon's presidential primary, but could not run due to sore-loser legislation and the Independent Party of Oregon chose to not nominate a presidential candidate. The Independence Party of Minnesota gave its presidential nomination to Evan McMullin.

The Alliance Party was formed on October 14, 2018. On December 17, 2018, the American Party of South Carolina successfully asked the South Carolina Election Commission to record that the party had changed its name to the Alliance Party. On May 4, 2019, the Independence Party of Minnesota voted to affiliate with the Alliance Party at its state convention. The Independent Party of Connecticut also affiliated with the Alliance Party and the Alliance Party became ballot qualified in Mississippi.

2020 presidential election
On April 25, 2020, the party nominated businessman Rocky De La Fuente for president and historian Darcy Richardson for vice president. The ticket was approved by a vote of twenty four to two. The convention was conducted through Zoom, chaired by Jim Rex, and attended by delegates including Greg Orman, Brian Moore, and Michael Steinberg.

On June 20, the Reform Party nominated De La Fuente and Richardson. De la Fuente defeated three other recognized candidates, Max Abramson, Souraya Faas, and Ben Zion. On June 23, the Natural Law Party of Michigan nominated De La Fuente and Richardson. On August 15, the American Independent Party nominated De La Fuente, but chose Kanye West rather than Richardson as their vice-presidential nominee.

De La Fuente and Richardson received 88,238 votes in the presidential election, around 0.06% of the national total. Following the presidential election, the American Delta Party and the Independence Party of New York joined the Alliance Party.

Party Leadership 
Michelle Griffith - National Chair

Philip Fuehrer - National Vice Chair

Ethan Michelle Gantz - National Vice Chair

Connie Tewes - National Treasurer

Electoral history

President and vice president

Best results in major races

References

External links

2018 establishments in the United States
Centrist political parties in the United States
Political parties established in 2018
Political parties in the United States